Deane Dana, Jr. was a member of the Los Angeles County Board of Supervisors.

Dana was born July 9, 1926, in New York City. He studied engineering at Stevens Institute of Technology in Hoboken, New Jersey.

After moving to California with his family, he lived in Long Beach and later, Rancho Palos Verdes. He worked as an engineer for 27 years at Pacific Telephone & Telegraph, and became an active participant in the local Republican Party and a close friend of future governor George Deukmejian, working in each of Deukmejian's campaigns from 1962 on.

In 1980, Dana was elected over Yvonne Brathwaite Burke to represent District 4 on the Los Angeles County Board of Supervisors. He served until he retired in 1996, when his friend and chief of staff, Don Knabe, was elected to replace him. Dana served as Chair of Los Angeles County and was president of the Coliseum Commission and the Southern California Regional Airport Authority. The Deane Dana Friendship Park and Nature Center in San Pedro is named in his honor.

Deane Dana died April 21, 2005, at Torrance Memorial Hospital in Torrance, California. He is buried in Green Hills Memorial Park in Rancho Palos Verdes.

References

Los Angeles County Board of Supervisors
People from Long Beach, California
California Republicans
1926 births
2005 deaths
20th-century American politicians
People from Rancho Palos Verdes, California